Truth or dare? is a mostly verbal party game requiring two or more players. Players are given the choice between answering a question truthfully, or performing a dare. The game is particularly popular among adolescents and children, and is sometimes used as a forfeit when gambling.

History 

The game has existed for hundreds of years, with at least one variant, "questions and commands", being attested as early as 1712:

Truth or dare may ultimately derive from command games such as the ancient Greek basilinda (in Greek: Βασιλινδα). This game is described by Julius Pollux: "in which we are told a king, elected by lot, commanded his comrades what they should perform".

See also 
 Game of dares

References 

Party games